Christa Williams (born: Christa Bojarzin 5 February 1926 – 28 or 29 July 2012) was a German pop singer most popular in the late 1950s and early 1960s.

Williams was chosen to represent Switzerland at the Eurovision Song Contest 1959 with the song "Irgendwoher" (From Somewhere). The song finished fourth out of 11 songs, and gained a total of 14 points.

Selected filmography
 At the Green Cockatoo by Night (1957)
 The Legs of Dolores (1957)
 Every Day Isn't Sunday (1959)
 Pension Schöller (1960)
 I Learned That in Paris (1960)

See also
Eurovision Song Contest 1959
Switzerland in the Eurovision Song Contest

References

External links

1926 births
2012 deaths
Eurovision Song Contest entrants for Switzerland
Eurovision Song Contest entrants of 1959
People from Trier
20th-century German musicians